Pierre Zimmermann (born May 26, 1955) is a Swiss-born real estate developer and champion bridge player formerly resident in Monaco.

As a developer, Zimmermann is founder and CEO of Zimmermann Immobilier, a real estate company in Geneva. As a 
bridge player, he is a quadruple world champion and playing captain formerly of the Monegasque team, and now of the Swiss team. He is also a tournament organizer, notably the biennial Monaco Cavendish since 2012 and the European championships by team from 2016 onwards on even years.

Biography
Pierre Zimmermann was born in Lausanne, Switzerland on 26 May 1955. He studied mathematics at the École Polytechnique Fédérale de Lausanne from 1973 to 1978 and, at the same time, business administration at HEC Lausanne from 1975 to 1979.

He has five children, including blogger, Tiffany Lea and Yann he had with ex-wife, artist Christine Zimmermann.

Professional career
In 1979, Pierre Zimmermann joined IBM in Zurich where he worked for five years. He then worked for Hill+Knowlton Strategies as an assistant corporate controller for Europe until 1985. From 1986 to 1988, he worked for Finagrain as a financial analyst, and then joined BBHQ (a venture capital firm) in 1988 again as a financial analyst.

In 1990, Pierre Zimmermann left BBHQ to create the Régie Zimmermann (today known as Zimmermann Immobilier), a real estate company in Geneva. In 2006, he opened a subsidiary in Lausanne.  In 2013 Zimmermann Immobilier reached 100 million Swiss francs in gross rental income.

Bridge career
Pierre Zimmermann started playing bridge occasionally in 1975 during his studies, but only started to play seriously in 1998. He obtained his first World Champion's title in 2007 in Shanghai his second in 2009 in São Paulo. and his third one in Chennai.

For several years, Zimmermann partnered with the professional player Franck Multon. Together they formed teams with top professional pairs, most recently Geir Helgemo–Tor Helness of Norway and Fulvio Fantoni–Claudio Nunes of Italy. In 2010 these six players all moved to Monaco in order to establish residency and thus obtain eligibility to compete as a national team in international . They have represented Monaco in European Bridge League (EBL) and world championship tournaments and finished second in the Bermuda Bowl in Bali in 2013. Following controversies over cheating, the Zimmermann team withdrew just prior to competing in the 2015 Bermuda Bowl and after hearings by the EBL, and the CAS judgment Fantoni and Nunes were acquitted because the proofs were inconsistent.

Bridge accomplishments

Gold medals

 World Transnational Open Teams Championship 2007, 2009, 2015 
 North American Bridge Championships 
 Vanderbilt 2010 
 Reisinger 2012, 2013 
 Spingold 2011, 2012, 2018 

 European Bridge League
 European Open Championships, mixed teams, 2011 Poznan
 European Team Championships, open, 2012 Dublin
 SportAccord, open, 2013 Beijing
 Bermuda Bowl 2022

Other medals

 Bermuda Bowl 2013 (2nd) 
 North American Bridge Championships
 Vanderbilt 2014 (2nd) 
 Reisinger 2011 (2nd) 
 Spingold 2014 (2nd), 2015 (2nd), 2016 (2nd), 2019 (2nd)  
 European Bridge League
 European Team Championships, open, 2014 Opatija (2nd)
 European Team Championships, open, 2022 Funchal, Madeira (2nd)
 World Bridge Championships
 Rosenblum Cup 2010 Philadelphia (3rd), 2014 Sanya (2nd)
 World Mind Sports Games, 2012 Lilles (3rd)

References

External links
 
 

Monegasque contract bridge players
Swiss contract bridge players
Bermuda Bowl players
Swiss emigrants to Monaco
Swiss expatriates in Monaco
Living people
1955 births
People from Lausanne